All I Wanted may refer to:

 "All I Wanted", a song by Paramore, from the 2009 album Brand New Eyes
 "All I Wanted" (Kansas song), 1986